Elko (Shoshoni: Natakkoa, "Rocks Piled on One Another") is the largest city in and county seat of Elko County, Nevada, United States. With a 2020 population of 20,564, Elko is currently growing at a rate of 0.31% annually and its population has increased by 11.86% since the 2010 Census, which recorded a population of 18,297. Elko serves as the economic hub of the Ruby Valley, a region with a population of over 55,000. 
 The city straddles the Humboldt River. Most of the residents in Elko live within the Tree Streets, houses lined with trees and greenery. Spring Creek, Nevada, serves as a bedroom community  from the city with a population of 13,805.

Elko is the principal city of the Elko Micropolitan Statistical Area, a micropolitan area that covers Elko and Eureka counties.

It is home to Great Basin College, as well as to the National Weather Service Weather Forecast Office serving most of northern and central Nevada.

History

Though Elko lies along the route of the historic California Trail, its roots as a settled town date only back to its establishment in 1868 by white settlers, when it was at the east end of the railroad tracks built by the Central Pacific Railroad (the portion of the First transcontinental railroad built from California to Utah). When the railroad crews moved on, Elko remained, serving as a center for ranching, mining, rail freight and general supplies.

Elko is said to have been named by Charles Crocker, a superintendent of the Central Pacific Railroad. He was especially fond of animal names and added the letter "o" to Elk. There is no definitive evidence of this naming history, but it has become the widely accepted version.

The first Elko County Courthouse was built in 1869. Elko was officially incorporated as a city in 1917.

In 1925, the Kelly Act (also known as the Air Mail Act of 1925) authorized the United States Postal Service to contract with private airlines for the feeder routes that fed the main transcontinental route. The first commercial airmail flight in the United States was on the  Airmail Route #5 from Pasco, Washington, to what would become Elko Regional Airport on April 6, 1926. The flight was piloted by Leon D. Cuddeback and included a brief stop in Boise, Idaho, to pick up more mail.

The 1910 replacement for the original courthouse is listed on the National Register of Historic Places. The U.S. Post Office-Elko Main, which was built in 1933, is also listed.

Geography

Climate
Elko's climate is semi-arid (Köppen climate classification BSk). There are an average of 1.8 days with  highs, 44 days of  highs, 24 days that do not top freezing, 198 nights with freezing lows, and 12 nights with sub- lows; the growing season here is short, as the average window for freezing temperatures is September 10 through June 9. Annual precipitation averages , falling on an average of 81 days, while annual snowfall averages . There are normally 130 sunny days each year.

Demographics

As of the census of 2000, there were 16,708 people, 6,200 households, and 4,216 families residing in the city. The population density was 1,153.3 people per square mile (445.2/km). There were 6,948 housing units at an average density of 479.6 per square mile (185.1/km). The racial makeup of the city was 83.16% White, 0.37% Black, 2.66% Native American, 1.12% Asian, 0.12% Pacific Islander, 9.63% from other races, and 2.94% from two or more races. Hispanic or Latino of any race were 21.12% of the population.

There were 6,200 households, out of which 39.2% had children under the age of 18 living with them, 53.5% were married couples living together, 9.1% had a female householder with no husband present, and 32.0% were non-families. 24.5% of all households were made up of individuals, and 6.3% had someone living alone who was 65 years of age or older. The average household size was 2.66 and the average family size was 3.24.

In the city, the population was spread out, with 30.3% under the age of 18, 9.8% from 18 to 24, 31.2% from 25 to 44, 21.0% from 45 to 64, and 7.6% who were 65 years of age or older. The median age was 32 years. For every 100 females, there were 104.6 males. For every 100 females age 18 and over, there were 105.3 males.

The median income for a household in the city was $48,608, and the median income for a family was $52,754. Males had a median income of $43,397 versus $27,366 for females. The per capita income for the city was $20,101. About 6.1% of families and 8.2% of the population were below the poverty line, including 8.9% of those under age 18 and 8.4% of those age 65 or over.

Economy

Elko's economy is based heavily on gold mining, with ranching, tourism and the casino industry providing additional jobs. The city is considered the capital of Nevada's goldbelt. The state of Nevada produces more gold than all but four countries, and most of the gold from Nevada is mined near Elko. This has caused the town to have a boom and bust economy consistent with the rises and declines in the price of gold. The town is surrounded by hundreds of abandoned mining camps, and viewing them is a popular local activity. A gold boom in the 1980s that ended in a bust in the late 1990s left the town with large numbers of abandoned homes and left the local governments struggling to survive on reduced tax revenues. With a new gold boom starting in 2009, city officials have been reluctant to hire new employees and have decided to build a reserve in the city budget to prepare for the next bust.

Elko has struggled to bring in other industries, mostly because of its isolation and the surrounding harsh desert environment. Hunter S. Thompson quipped that in Elko, "The federal government owns 90% of this land, and most of it is useless for anything except weapons testing and poison-gas experiments," although no experiments have been conducted in Elko or Elko County but were famously carried out at the Nevada Test Site near Rachel, in southern Nevada.

Arts, culture and tourist attractions

Annual cultural events
Elko has been the home of the annual National Cowboy Poetry Gathering since 1985. This festival is held each January and is a week-long celebration of life in the rural West, featuring poetry, music, stories, gear, film, photography, and food.

Every July, since 1963, Elko is host to the National Basque Festival. In 2013 they were scheduled to celebrate their 50th anniversary. Humorously referred to as the "Basquo Fiasco", it is a celebration of traditional Basque culture and its ties to the Elko community. The festival includes strongman competitions, handball, a running of the bulls, traditional food and wine, and Basque dancing.

Museums and other points of interest

Elko is the home of the Western Folklife Center, a regional nonprofit organization that works to expand understanding of the everyday traditions of people who live and work in the American West. The Western Folklife Center is downtown in the old Pioneer Hotel.

A number of casinos are located in Elko, including Stockmen's Casino and Hotel, the Commercial Casino, the High Desert Casino, Gold Dust West, The Maverick Casino, and the Gold Country Inn and Casino. The Commercial Casino is notable for having a stuffed  polar bear on display. For many years the Red Lion brought gamblers to Elko from many parts of the country through flights on Casino Express. The flights to Elko ended in February 2006.

Elko is also home to legal prostitutes and contains active brothels. Under Nevada law, any county with a population of less than 400,000 is allowed to license brothels if it so chooses.
Several geothermal features can be found in Elko, the largest of which is the Elko Hot Hole. Hot springs were used by travelers on the California Trail and subsequently by settlers.

Notable attractions in the Elko region include the Ruby Mountains, in which is the popular Lamoille Canyon. To the north, the Jarbidge Wilderness is among the least visited and cleanest wilderness areas in the United States.

Education
Elko is served by the Elko County School District; they have one high school within the city limits, Elko High School.

Great Basin College is located in Elko.

Elko also has a public library, a branch of the Elko-Lander-Eureka County Library System.

Media

Newspapers
 Elko Daily Free Press
 Elko Independent

Television

 Elko Television District
 KENV-DT (TBD affiliate, formerly of NBC)

Radio
Ruby Radio:
 KBGZ 103.9 FM - "BIG Country" Country
 KHIX 96.7 FM - "Mix 96.7 FM" Adult Contemporary
 KUOL 94.5 FM - "94.5 Kool FM" Classic Hits
 KBGZ-HD2 107.7 FM - "TalkRadio 107.7 FM" News Talk
 KBGZ-HD3 101.1 FM - "Coyote Rock 101.1 FM" Classic Rock
 KBGZ-HD4 100.5 FM - "True Country Classics 100.1 FM" - Country Classics

Elko Broadcasting Company:
 KELK 1240 AM - Adult Contemporary
 KELK 95.9 FM - Adult Contemporary
 KLKO 93.7 FM - Adult Hits
 KRJC 95.3 FM - Country
 KEAU 104.7 FM - Sports

Infrastructure

Transportation
Elko is the largest city between Salt Lake City and Reno, located along Interstate 80. Nevada State Route 225 (Mountain City Highway) connects Elko to Owyhee and southern Idaho, while Nevada State Route 227 (Lamoille Highway) extends southeast to Spring Creek and Lamoille.

Passenger bus service to Elko is available on Greyhound Lines, while Amtrak's daily California Zephyr provides train passenger service via Elko Station.

SkyWest Airlines, operating as Delta Connection, serves Elko Regional Airport (EKO) with regional jet service nonstop to the Delta Air Lines hub in Salt Lake City (SLC).

Elko was once the home base of a jet air carrier, Casino Express Airlines, which operated Boeing 737-200 jetliners to many cities in the U.S. on a scheduled charter basis in support of the local casino industry. Casino Express changed its name to Xtra Airways and relocated its headquarters in June 2010 to Boise, Idaho, and again in May 2015 to Coral Gables, Florida.
 

Elko also was previously served by United Airlines with scheduled passenger jet service during the 1970s and early 1980s. According to Official Airline Guide (OAG) flight schedules as well as the airline's system timetables, United operated Boeing 737-200 jetliners into the Elko Regional Airport on a year-round basis with a daily round trip routing of San Francisco (SFO)-Reno (RNO)-Elko (EKO)-Ely (ELY)-Salt Lake City (SLC). United eventually discontinued all flights into Elko after serving the airport for over 50 years.

Notable people
 Dirk Borgognone, football player who currently holds the record for the longest field goal ever kicked in the history of high school football, 68 yards.
 Lewis R. Bradley, second governor of Nevada, from 1871 to 1879; resident of Elko
 Mae Caine, suffragist and women's rights activist, civic leader, and government official
 Tim Gilligan, football player
 Morley Griswold, 16th governor of Nevada, from 1934 to 1935; born in Elko
 Dave Pratt, radio host, grew up in Elko before moving to Phoenix, Arizona
 Cy Sneed, Major League Baseball pitcher, was born in Elko.

References

External links
 City of Elko official website
 Elko Chamber of Commerce

 
1917 establishments in Nevada
Cities in Elko County, Nevada
Cities in Nevada
County seats in Nevada

Populated places established in 1868